The White Narrows Formation is a geologic formation in Nevada that preserves fossils.

See also

 List of fossiliferous stratigraphic units in Nevada
 Paleontology in Nevada

References
 

Geologic formations of Nevada